Phenyo Mongala (born June 10, 1985 in Kanye) is a Botswana footballer who currently plays for CS Don Bosco in the DR Congolese Linafoot.

International career
He is a member for the Botswana national football team.

Personal life
Mongala is also known as Mzambiya.

Notes

1985 births
Living people
Botswana footballers
Botswana international footballers
University of Pretoria F.C. players
Botswana expatriate footballers
Township Rollers F.C. players
Botswana expatriate sportspeople in South Africa
Platinum Stars F.C. players
Association football midfielders
Orlando Pirates F.C. players
Expatriate soccer players in South Africa
Bloemfontein Celtic F.C. players
2012 Africa Cup of Nations players
CS Don Bosco players
Expatriate footballers in the Democratic Republic of the Congo